The taxonomy of the Gastropoda, as revised by Winston Ponder and David R. Lindberg in 1997, is an older taxonomy of the class Gastropoda, the class of molluscs consisting of all snails and slugs. The full name of the work in which this taxonomy was published is Towards a phylogeny of gastropod molluscs: an analysis using morphological characters.

This taxonomy assigns the various Gastropods into ranked categories, such as sub-orders and families, but does not address the classification of genera or individual species. This classification scheme is based on the molluscs' internal and external shapes and forms, but did not take into account any analysis of their DNA or RNA. 

The classification below was the most recent until Bouchet and Rocroi published their revised taxonomy in 2005, which differs primarily in that the higher taxa are expressed as unranked clades where known, and termed "informal groups" or groups" where monophyly (a single lineage) has not yet been determined, and where polyphyly (more than one lineage) is suspected. 

Ponder & Lindberg (1997) used only four families to analyze the Euthyneura. Further work by Dayrat & Tillier (2002) provided a great deal of detail about the relationships between within the Euthyneura.

Ponder & Lindberg (1997) did not use Linnean taxonomical ranks in their work, but the results of their paper were widely adapted and used with Linnean taxonomical ranks by other authors. An example of such taxonomy follows:

Taxonomy 
Class Gastropoda Cuvier, 1797
Incertæ sedis
 Order Bellerophontinaka (fossil)
 Order Mimospirina (fossil)
Subclass Eogastropoda Ponder & David R. Lindberg, 1996 (earlier: Prosobranchia)
Order Euomphalida de Koninck 1881 (fossil)
 Superfamily Macluritoidea
 Superfamily Euomphaloidea
 Superfamily Platyceratoidea
 Order Patellogastropoda Lindberg, 1986 (true limpets)

 Suborder Patellina Van Ihering, 1876
 Superfamily Patelloidea Rafinesque, 1815
 Suborder Nacellina David R. Lindberg, 1988
 Superfamily Acmaeoidea Carpenter, 1857
 Superfamily Nacelloidea Thiele, 1891
 Suborder Lepetopsina McLean, 1990
 Superfamily Lepetopsoidea McLean, 1990
Subclass Orthogastropoda Ponder & David R. Lindberg, 1996  (earlier Prosobranchia, Opisthobranchia)Incertæ sedis' Order Murchisoniina Cox & Knight, 1960 (fossil)
 Superfamily Murchisonioidea Koken, 1889
 Superfamily Loxonematoidea Koken, 1889
 Superfamily Lophospiroidea Wenz, 1938
 Superfamily Straparollinoidea
 Grade Subulitoidea Lindström, 1884
Superorder Cocculiniformia Haszprunar, 1987
 Superfamily Cocculinoidea Dall, 1882
 Superfamily Lepetelloidea Dall, 1882 (deep sea limpets)
Superorder "Hot Vent Taxa" Ponder & David R. Lindberg, 1997
 Order Neomphaloida Sitnikova & Starobogatov, 1983
 Superfamily Neomphaloidea McLean, 1981 (hydrothermal vents limpets)
 Superfamily Peltospiroidea McLean, 1989
Superorder Vetigastropoda Salvini-Plawen, 1989 (limpets)

 Superfamily Fissurelloidea Fleming, 1822 (keyhole limpets)
 Superfamily Haliotoidea Rafinesque, 1815 (abalones)
 Superfamily Lepetodriloidea McLean, 1988 (hydrothermal vent limpets)
 Superfamily Pleurotomarioidea Swainson, 1840  (slit shells)
 Superfamily Seguenzioidea Verrill, 1884
 Superfamily Trochoidea Rafinesque, 1815 (top shells)
Superorder Neritaemorphi Koken, 1896
 Order Cyrtoneritomorpha (fossil)
 Order Neritopsina Cox & Knight, 1960
Superfamily Neritoidea Lamarck, 1809
Superorder Caenogastropoda Cox, 1960
 Order Architaenioglossa Haller, 1890
 Superfamily Ampullarioidea J.E. Gray, 1824
 Superfamily Cyclophoroidea J.E. Gray, 1847 (terrestrials)
 Order Sorbeoconcha Ponder & David R. Lindberg, 1997
 Suborder Discopoda P. Fischer, 1884
 Superfamily Campaniloidea Douvillé, 1904
 Superfamily Cerithioidea Férussac, 1822
 Suborder Hypsogastropoda Ponder & David R. Lindberg, 1997
 Infraorder Littorinimorpha Golikov & Starobogatov, 1975
 Superfamily Calyptraeoidea Lamarck, 1809
 Superfamily Capuloidea J. Fleming, 1822
 Superfamily Carinarioidea Blainville, 1818 (formerly called Heteropoda)
 Superfamily Cingulopsoidea Fretter & Patil, 1958
 Superfamily Cypraeoidea Rafinesque, 1815 (cowries)
 Superfamily Ficoidea Meek, 1864
 Superfamily Laubierinoidea Warén & Bouchet, 1990
 Superfamily Littorinoidea (Children), 1834 (periwinkles)
 Superfamily Naticoidea Forbes, 1838 (moon shells)
 Superfamily Rissooidea J.E. Gray, 1847 (Risso shells) (includes genus Oncomelania, schistosomiasis transmission vector)
 Superfamily Stromboidea Rafinesque, 1815 (true conchs)
 Superfamily Tonnoidea Suter, 1913
 Superfamily Trivioidea Troschel, 1863
 Superfamily Vanikoroidea J.E. Gray, 1840
 Superfamily Velutinoidea J.E. Gray, 1840
 Superfamily Vermetoidea Rafinesque, 1815 (worm shells)
 Superfamily Xenophoroidea Troschel, 1852 (carrier shells)
 Infraorder Ptenoglossa J.E. Gray, 1853
 Superfamily Eulimoidea Philippi, 1853
 Superfamily Janthinoidea Lamarck, 1812
 Superfamily Triphoroidea J.E. Gray, 1847
 Infraorder Neogastropoda Thiele, 1929
 Superfamily Buccinoidea (whelks, false tritions)
 Superfamily Cancellarioidea Forbes & Hanley, 1851
 Superfamily Conoidea Rafinesque, 1815
 Superfamily Muricoidea Rafinesque, 1815
Superorder Heterobranchia J.E. Gray, 1840
 Order Heterostropha P. Fischer, 1885
 Superfamily Architectonicoidea J.E. Gray, 1840
 Superfamily Nerineoidea Zittel, 1873 (fossil)
 Superfamily Omalogyroidea G.O. Sars, 1878
 Superfamily Pyramidelloidea J.E. Gray, 1840
 Superfamily Rissoelloidea J.E. Gray, 1850
 Superfamily Valvatoidea J.E. Gray, 1840
 Order Opisthobranchia Milne-Edwards, 1848
 Suborder Cephalaspidea P. Fischer, 1883
 Superfamily Acteonoidea D'Orbigny, 1835
 Superfamily Bulloidea Lamarck, 1801
 Superfamily Cylindrobulloidea Thiele, 1931 (has to be included in the Sacoglossa)
 Superfamily Diaphanoidea Odhner, 1914
 Superfamily Haminoeoidea Pilsbry, 1895
 Superfamily Philinoidea J.E. Gray, 1850
 Superfamily Ringiculoidea Philippi, 1853
 Suborder Sacoglossa Von Ihering, 1876
 Superfamily Oxynooidea H. Adams & A. Adams, 1854
 Suborder Anaspidea P. Fischer, 1883 (sea hares)
 Superfamily Akeroidea Pilsbry, 1893
 Superfamily Aplysioidea Lamarck, 1809
 Suborder Notaspidea P. Fischer, 1883
 Superfamily Tylodinoidea J.E. Gray, 1847
 Superfamily Pleurobranchoidea Férussac, 1822
 Suborder Thecosomata Blainville, 1824 (sea butterflies)
 Infraorder Euthecosomata
 Superfamily Limacinoidea
 Superfamily Cavolinioidea
 Infraorder Pseudothecosomata
 Superfamily Peraclidoidea
 Superfamily Cymbulioidea
 Suborder Gymnosomata Blainville, 1824 (sea angels)
 Family Clionidae Rafinesque, 1815
 Family Cliopsidae Costa, 1873
 Family Hydromylidae Pruvot-Fol, 1942
 Family Laginiopsidae Pruvot-Fol, 1922
 Family Notobranchaeidae Pelseneer, 1886
 Family Pneumodermatidae Latreille, 1825
 Family Thliptodontidae Kwietniewski, 1910

 Suborder Nudibranchia Blainville, 1814 (nudibranchs)
 Infraorder Anthobranchia Férussac, 1819
 Superfamily Doridoidea Rafinesque, 1815
 Superfamily Doridoxoidea Bergh, 1900
 Superfamily Onchidoridoidea Alder & Hancock, 1845
 Superfamily Polyceroidea Alder & Hancock, 1845
 Infraorder Cladobranchia Willan & Morton, 1984
 Superfamily Dendronotoidea Allman, 1845
 Superfamily Arminoidea Rafinesque, 1814
 Superfamily Metarminoidea Odhner in  Franc, 1968
 Superfamily Aeolidioidea J.E. Gray, 1827
 Order Pulmonata Cuvier in Blainville, 1814 (pulmonates)
 Suborder Systellommatophora Pilsbry, 1948
 Superfamily Onchidioidea Rafinesque, 1815
 Superfamily Otinoidea H. Adams & A. Adams, 1855
 Superfamily Rathouisioidea Sarasin, 1889
 Suborder Basommatophora Keferstein in Bronn, 1864 (freshwater pulmonates, pond snails)
 Superfamily Acroloxoidea Thiele, 1931
 Superfamily Amphiboloidea J.E. Gray, 1840
 Superfamily Chilinoidea H. Adams & A. Adams, 1855
 Superfamily Glacidorboidea Ponder, 1986
 Superfamily Lymnaeoidea Rafinesque, 1815
 Superfamily Planorboidea Rafinesque, 1815
 Superfamily Siphonarioidea J.E. Gray, 1840
 Suborder Eupulmonata  Haszprunar & Huber, 1990
 Infraorder Acteophila Dall, 1885 (= formerly Archaeopulmonata)
 Superfamily Melampoidea Stimpson, 1851
 Infraorder Trimusculiformes Minichev & Starobogatov, 1975
 Superfamily Trimusculoidea Zilch, 1959
 Infraorder Stylommatophora A. Schmidt, 1856 (land snails)
 Subinfraorder Orthurethra
 Superfamily Achatinelloidea Gulick, 1873
 Superfamily Cochlicopoidea Pilsbry, 1900
 Superfamily Partuloidea Pilsbry, 1900
 Superfamily Pupilloidea Turton, 1831
 Subinfraorder Sigmurethra
 Superfamily Acavoidea Pilsbry, 1895
 Superfamily Achatinoidea Swainson, 1840
 Superfamily Aillyoidea Baker, 1960
 Superfamily Arionoidea J.E. Gray in Turnton, 1840
 Superfamily Buliminoidea Clessin, 1879
 Superfamily Camaenoidea Pilsbry, 1895
 Superfamily Clausilioidea Mörch, 1864
 Superfamily Dyakioidea Gude & Woodward, 1921
 Superfamily Gastrodontoidea Tryon, 1866
 Superfamily Helicoidea Rafinesque, 1815
 Superfamily Helixarionoidea Bourguignat, 1877
 Superfamily Limacoidea Rafinesque, 1815
 Superfamily Oleacinoidea H. Adams & A. Adams, 1855
 Superfamily Orthalicoidea Albers-Martens, 1860
 Superfamily Plectopylidoidea Moellendorf, 1900
 Superfamily Polygyroidea Pilsbry, 1894
 Superfamily Punctoidea Morse, 1864
 Superfamily Rhytidoidea Pilsbry, 1893
 Superfamily Sagdidoidea Pilsbry, 1895
 Superfamily Staffordioidea Thiele, 1931
 Superfamily Streptaxoidea J.E. Gray, 1806
 Superfamily Strophocheiloidea Thiele, 1926
 Superfamily Trigonochlamydoidea Hese, 1882
 Superfamily Zonitoidea Mörch, 1864
? Superfamily Athoracophoroidea P. Fischer, 1883 (=  Tracheopulmonata)
? Superfamily Succineoidea Beck, 1837 (=  Heterurethra)
Other extant classes of the Mollusca are Bivalvia, Scaphopoda, Aplacophora, Polyplacophora, Monoplacophora and Cephalopoda.

 See also 
 
 

 References 

 Further reading 
 Ponder W. F. & Lindberg D. R. (1996). Gastropod phylogeny—challenges for the 90s. p. 135–154. In: Taylor J. (ed.) Origin and Evolutionary Radiation of the Mollusca''. Oxford University Press, Oxford.

Gastropod taxonomy
Systems of animal taxonomy
Malacological literature